Rufai Garba was the Military Administrator of Anambra State in Nigeria from 21 December 1996 to 6 August 1998 during the military regime of General Sani Abacha, and then of Sokoto State from 6 August 1998 to 29 May 1999 during the transitional regime of General Abdulsalami Abubakar, when he handed over to the elected Executive Governor Attahiru Dalhatu Bafarawa.

As Anambra Governor he approved construction of a headquarters building for the State Education Commission, but nothing was done until work started in 2009.
In February 1998, a fire of unexplained cause burnt down the governor's office in Anambra State Government House.
In August 1998 he said that citizens of Anambra State feared the anti-crime task force as much as they feared criminals. He said the task force was extorting money at roadblocks and detaining people illegally, and said the government would crack down on this activity.

On April 20, 1996, Alhaji Ibrahim Dasuki, the 18th Sultan of Sokoto, was deposed by the military government. 
As Sokoto Governor in 1999, Rufai Garba approved a settlement of Dasuki's entitlements and provided him with a welfare package.

References

Nigerian Air Force officers
Living people
Nigerian Muslims
Governors of Anambra State
Nigerian military governors of Sokoto State
Year of birth missing (living people)